Charles Coles Diggs Jr. (December 2, 1922 – August 24, 1998) was an American politician from the U.S. state of Michigan who served in the state senate and U.S. House of Representatives. He was the first African American elected to Congress from Michigan.

A member of the Democratic Party, Diggs was an early participant in the civil rights movement. In September 1955, the Michigan Representative garnered national attention when he attended the trial of the two white Mississippians accused of murdering Emmett Till. He was elected the first chairman of the Congressional Black Caucus and was a staunch critic of the apartheid regime in South Africa.

Diggs resigned from the United States House of Representatives and served 14 months of a three-year sentence for mail fraud, although he maintained his innocence.

Early life
Born in Detroit, Michigan, Charles was the only child of Mayme E. Jones Diggs, and Charles Diggs Sr. He attended the University of Michigan, Detroit College of Law (1952-52), and Fisk University. He served in the United States Army from 1943 to 1945. After his discharge, Diggs worked as a funeral director. He served as a member of the Michigan State Senate from the 3rd district 1951–54, just as his father had from 1937 to 1944.

He was rooted in his family's business, the House of Diggs, which at one time was said to be Michigan's largest funeral home.

Political career
In 1954, Diggs defeated incumbent U.S. Representative George D. O'Brien in the Democratic Party primary elections for Michigan's 13th congressional district. He went on to win the general election to the 84th Congress and was subsequently re-elected to the next twelve Congresses, serving from January 3, 1955, until his resignation June 3, 1980.

The first African American to be elected to Congress in Michigan, Diggs made significant contributions to the struggle for civil rights.  In April 1955, three months after he was first sworn in to Congress, he gave a well-received speech to a crowd of about 10,000 in Mound Bayou, Mississippi, at the annual conference of the Regional Council of Negro Leadership (RCNL), probably the largest civil rights group in the state.  His host was the RCNL's leader, Dr. T.R.M. Howard, a wealthy black surgeon and entrepreneur.

Later that same year, Diggs returned to Mississippi, where he received national attention as the only congressman to attend and monitor the trial of the accused killers of Emmett Till, a black teenager from Chicago who was murdered during a trip to the state. The outrage generated by the case gave a tremendous momentum to the emerging civil rights movement. Although he was a member of Congress, the sheriff did not exempt him from Jim Crow treatment.  Diggs had to sit at a small table along with black reporters. Soon after the trial concluded, white mobs began to search for the witnesses involved in the case, including then-18-year-old Willie Reed. Diggs personally escorted Reed to Detroit, after a nighttime escape from Reed's home in Drew, Mississippi to Memphis, Tennessee. There the young man changed his name to Willie Louis for safety.

Following the trial, Diggs continued the fight for justice, calling upon President Eisenhower to call a special session of Congress to consider civil rights.

In 1969, Diggs was appointed to the post of chairman of the Subcommittee on Africa of the Committee on Foreign Affairs, where he strongly advocated ending apartheid in South Africa. He was a committed publicist for the liberation cause in South Africa, and his 'Action Manifesto' (1972) displayed his support for the armed struggle against apartheid. In it, Diggs criticized the United States government for decrying the use of such violence when it failed to condemn measures used by the South African government to subjugate the majority of its own people. Diggs also argued that American corporations were propping up the apartheid government through their investments, and he was banned from South Africa by its government for these positions.

Diggs was a founding member and the first chairman of the Congressional Black Caucus, a group of African-American representatives and senators working to address the needs and rights of black constituents. While chairman, Diggs successfully led a caucus boycott of President Nixon's State of the Union Address, following Nixon's refusal to meet to discuss issues relevant to African Americans.  This and similar work contributed to Diggs being named on the Master list of Nixon political opponents.

In March 1978, Diggs was charged with taking kickbacks from staff whose salaries he raised. He was convicted on October 7, 1978, on 11 counts of mail fraud and filing false payroll forms. Diggs insisted he had done nothing wrong, and was re-elected while awaiting sentencing. He was censured by the House on July 31, 1979, and resigned from Congress June 3, 1980. He was sentenced to three years in prison and served 14 months.

Personal life
Diggs died of a stroke at Greater Southeast Community Hospital in Washington, D.C.  He is interred at Detroit Memorial Park in Warren, Michigan.

See also
List of African-American United States representatives
List of American federal politicians convicted of crimes
List of United States representatives expelled, censured, or reprimanded

References

External links

The Political Graveyard
Congressional Bad Boys

|-

|-

1922 births
1998 deaths
20th-century African-American politicians
20th-century American politicians
20th-century Baptists
African-American members of the United States House of Representatives
African-American state legislators in Michigan
Baptists from Michigan
Censured or reprimanded members of the United States House of Representatives
Democratic Party members of the United States House of Representatives from Michigan
Fisk University alumni
American funeral directors
Michigan politicians convicted of crimes
Democratic Party Michigan state senators
Military personnel from Detroit
Politicians convicted of mail and wire fraud
Politicians from Detroit
United States Army personnel of World War II
United States Army soldiers
University of Michigan alumni
African-American men in politics